The 2019 BRDC British Formula 3 Championship was a motor racing championship for open wheel, formula racing cars held across England, with one round in Belgium. The 2019 season was the fourth organised by the British Racing Drivers' Club in the United Kingdom. The championship featured a mix of professional motor racing teams and privately funded drivers, and also featured the 2-litre 230-bhp Tatuus-Cosworth single seat race car in the main series. The season commenced at Oulton Park on 20 April and ended on 15 September at Donington Park, after eight triple header events for a total of twenty-four races.

Teams and drivers
All teams are British-registered.

Race calendar and results 

The calendar was revealed on 8 November 2018. The series supports British GT at all events, excluding the 17-18 August round at Silverstone Circuit.

Championship standings
Scoring system

Points were awarded to the top 20 classified finishers in races one and three, with the second race awarding points to only the top 15. Race two, which reversed the order of the race one finishers, providing they set a lap time within 103% of the fastest driver, will be awarded extra points for positions gained from drivers' respective starting positions.

Notes
1 2 3 refers to positions gained and thus extra points earned during race two.

Drivers' championship

Notes

References

External links
 

BRDC British Formula 3 Championship seasons
BRDC Formula 3
BRDC Formula 3
BRDC Formula 3